The Republican Governors Association (RGA) is a Washington, D.C.-based 527 organization founded in 1961, consisting of U.S. state and territorial Republican governors. The Republican Governors Association is dedicated to one primary objective: electing and supporting Republican governors.

The current RGA co-chairs are Governor Doug Ducey of Arizona, who assumed the office in December 2020, and Governor Pete Ricketts of Nebraska, who joined him in 2022. Governor Kim Reynolds of Iowa serves as vice-chair.

The RGA's Executive Committee for 2021 includes Governors Eric Holcomb of Indiana, Larry Hogan of Maryland, Charlie Baker of Massachusetts, Pete Ricketts of Nebraska, Doug Burgum of North Dakota, Henry McMaster of South Carolina, Kristi Noem of South Dakota, and Greg Abbott of Texas. Additionally, Governor Bill Lee of Tennessee was elected Policy Chairman, and Governor Tate Reeves of Mississippi was elected Policy Vice Chairman.

Its Democratic counterpart is the Democratic Governors Association. The RGA is not directly affiliated with the non-partisan National Governors Association.

List of current Republican governors
All of the following states are members of the Republican Governors Association:

No governor of a U.S. territory is a member of the Republican Governors Association

List of RGA chairs

Executive directors

Election cycles

2018 
36 gubernatorial races occurred during the 2018 election cycle. The elections were held on November 6, 2018, with Republicans losing a net of 7 governorships.

In 2017, it sponsored a website The Free Telegraph to promote issues from the perspective of Republicans.

2020 
In the 2020 election cycle, 11 states and two territories held elections for governors. The elections were held on November 3, 2020, with Republicans gaining a net of one governorship, Montana, for state elections. This marked the first time Montana elected a Republican governor in 16 years.  Former Governor Wanda Vázquez Garced, who was a member of the Republican Governors Association, lost reelection in Puerto Rico, meaning a net loss of one Republican governor for territorial elections. As of 2021, this election meant that only one of five American territories have Republican governors.

2022 
36 gubernatorial races occurred during the 2022 election cycle. The elections were held on November 8, 2022, with Republicans losing a net of 2 governorships.

Fundraising
In the 18 months ending June 30, 2010, the RGA raised $58 million, while its counterpart DGA raised $40 million. "Unlike the national political parties and federal candidates, the governors' associations can take in unlimited amounts from corporations," according to Bloomberg, which notes that the RGA recently received $1 million from Rupert Murdoch's News Corporation, the parent corporation of Fox News, and $500,000 from WellPoint (now Anthem).

In 2018, the Republican Governors Association announced that $63.2 million was raised in all of 2017, including $27.2 million raised in the final six months of the year, setting a new fundraising record that significantly eclipses the $52.5 million raised in 2013, the last comparable year.

References

External links
 
 Contributors and Expenditures at OpenSecrets

527 organizations
Government-related professional associations in the United States
Organizations based in Washington, D.C.
Governors Association
 
State governors of the United States
1961 establishments in the United States